Luxembourg High Security Hub, until 2021 known as Luxembourg Freeport, is a €50-million high security storage facility adjacent to Luxembourg Findel Airport. The freeport opened in September 2014.

The building 

The building was designed by Atelier d'Architecture 3BM3, with interior design by Johanna Grawunder. The atrium includes a large mural by the Portuguese artist Vhils, etched into one of the concrete walls.

Luxembourg Freeport provides temperature and humidity controlled storage for works of art and other valuables.

Security for the facility is primarily provided by a security system which includes more than 300 CCTV cameras. Also part of the overall security infrastructure is a fire protection system that "sucks oxygen from the atmosphere" rather than using water that might damage works of art. The facility is surrounded by walls topped with barbed wire and the four bullion rooms have 50-cm thick metal doors. There are also four special climate-controlled rooms capable of storing up to 700,000 bottles of wine.

Attractions 
According to The Economist, the "attractions are similar to those offered by offshore financial centres: security and confidentiality, not much scrutiny, the ability for owners to hide behind nominees, and an array of tax advantages." 

Apart from security, the attraction for customers is that they can store and trade works of art and other valuable items without having to pay customs or sales tax. Tax-free status is possible because the items stored at the facility are technically "in transit". As the Freeport's back doors open directly onto the airport, anything therein is deemed not to have actually yet entered Luxembourg.

Ownership 
Luxembourg High Security Hub is majority owned by the Swiss businessman and art dealer Yves Bouvier, who also owns majority stakes in the freeports of Singapore and Geneva. Bouvier was one of three people arrested in Monaco in February 2015 on suspicion of fraud through the sale of works of art at inflated prices or with fake documentation, which has put his freeports under political scrutiny. Tony Reynard, the chairman of Bouvier's Singapore freeport, has said, "We had to move on to Luxembourg because Geneva was full. With Luxembourg we have an airport that can handle cargo. In Geneva you have to move everything by road." Reynard added that there were plans to expand to Dubai and Shanghai.

Criticism 
In 2018, the Freeport came under criticism for its lack of transparency from two members of the European Parliament, Ana Gomes and Evelyn Regner. Tasked with investigating money laundering and tax evasion in the EU between 2015 and 2017, they concluded in their final report that freeports "offer offshore storage solutions that can promote money laundering and tax concealment". Furthermore, a European Commission study in 2018 concluded that demand for freeports was increasing just as banks began to crackdown on illegal financial activities, and that their lack of regulation was making them "conducive to secrecy". The report cited the Bouvier Affair, in which Luxembourg freeport owner Yves Bouvier "allegedly defrauded clients by misrepresenting the cost of artworks and subsequently overcharging them." 

In January 2019, German MEP Wolf Klinz wrote a letter to European Commission President Jean-Claude Juncker demanding he take action to close loopholes that allow financial crimes to be committed in the European Union. In the letter, Klinz referred specifically to the Luxembourg freeport, stating that the freeport had "been alleged to be a fertile ground for money laundering and tax evasion." The facility was described as a "black hole" for storing goods away out of the authorities’ reach, and MEPs subsequently called for freeports to be banned within the EU.

However, the freeport's management has disputed these allegations, arguing that it surpasses EU regulations in financial controls. Instead, the management stated that the freeport is primarily used for its policy to provide insurance premium reductions, rather than tax evasion.

References

External links 

Free ports
Commercial buildings in Luxembourg
2014 establishments in Luxembourg
Offshore finance